Sumner Chilton Powell (October 2, 1924 in Northampton, Massachusetts – July 8, 1993 in Colora, Maryland) was an American historian and history teacher at the Choate School, a college-prep boarding school in Wallingford, Connecticut.

He attended The Taft School in Watertown, Connecticut, earned a bachelor's degree from Amherst College in 1946, and from 1947 to 1952 was an active US Naval Officer attaining the rank of Lieutenant (jg), but remained a Naval Reserve Officer until 1961. He earned a doctorate in history from Harvard University in 1956.

In 1957 he published From Mythical to Medieval Man.  He won the 1964 Pulitzer Prize for History for Puritan Village: The Formation of a New England Town (1963), based on records on Sudbury, Massachusetts from 1638–1660, tracing every settler back to England.

References

External links
 

1924 births
1993 deaths
Historians of New England
Pulitzer Prize for History winners
Taft School alumni
Amherst College alumni
Harvard University alumni
20th-century American historians
20th-century American male writers
American male non-fiction writers